"Kiss Tomorrow Goodbye" is a song co-written and recorded by American country music artist Luke Bryan. It was released in August 2012 as the fourth and final single from his album Tailgates & Tanlines. The song was written by Bryan, Jeff Stevens and Shane McAnally.

Content
The song is set in the key of F minor with a chord pattern of D-Fm-E. It is about a couple who have decided to break up because the only thing they can get right is making love and they decide to "do what [they] do best" one last time before breaking up. Co-writer and record producer Jeff Stevens told Taste of Country that he came up with the title while playing his guitar, but did not finalize the song until he presented the idea to Bryan and co-writer Shane McAnally.

Critical reception
Billy Dukes of Taste of Country gave the song three stars out of five, writing that "it’s got a great hook, and a quirky, memorable lyric but after back-to-back number one hits of a similar groove, it’s wearing a little thin." Ben Foster of Country Universe gave the song a C+ grade, saying that it "could have been good, but this endlessly distracting wall of noise doesn’t let it come anywhere close to its potential." Matt Bjorke of Roughstock gave the song a favorable review, writing that "Luke sings this one well and with the tasty melody accompaniment, it’s a memorable radio song."

Music video
The music video was directed by Shaun Silva and premiered in October 2012.

Chart performance
"Kiss Tomorrow Goodbye" debuted at number 55 on the U.S. Billboard Hot Country Songs chart for the week of July 28, 2012. It also debuted at number 92 on the U.S. Billboard Hot 100 chart for the week of September 8, 2012. It also debuted at number 91 on the Canadian Hot 100 chart for the week of September 8, 2012.

Charts and certifications

Weekly charts

Year-end charts

Certifications

}

References

2012 singles
Country ballads
2010s ballads
Luke Bryan songs
Capitol Records Nashville singles
Songs written by Luke Bryan
Songs written by Jeff Stevens (singer)
Songs written by Shane McAnally
Music videos directed by Shaun Silva
Song recordings produced by Mark Bright (record producer)
2011 songs